The William Andrews House, at 741 Seminary St. in Napa, California, was built in 1892.  It was listed on the National Register of Historic Places in 1992.

It is a two-and-a-half-story Queen Anne-style house.

References

National Register of Historic Places in Napa County, California
Queen Anne architecture in California
Houses completed in 1892